August Tanttu (14 October 1859, in Hirvensalmi – 13 January 1937) was a Finnish farmer and politician. He was a member of the Parliament of Finland, representing several different parties over time: the Young Finnish Party from 1908 to 1910; the People's Party from 1917 to 1919; and the National Coalition Party from 1922 to 1924.

References

1859 births
1937 deaths
People from Hirvensalmi
People from Mikkeli Province (Grand Duchy of Finland)
Young Finnish Party politicians
People's Party (Finland, 1917) politicians
National Coalition Party politicians
Members of the Parliament of Finland (1908–09)
Members of the Parliament of Finland (1910–11)
Members of the Parliament of Finland (1911–13)
Members of the Parliament of Finland (1913–16)
Members of the Parliament of Finland (1917–19)
Members of the Parliament of Finland (1922–24)
People of the Finnish Civil War (White side)